Emirates Institute for Finance (EIF) معهد الإمارات للدراسات المصرفية والمالية is an educational institute that was established in 1983 in Sharjah in the United Arab Emirates. The Institute has three campuses, at Sharjah, Abu Dhabi, and Dubai.

The Institute is currently offering a Bachelor of Science in Banking and Finance (BSBF), a Higher Banking Diploma program (HBD), and an Islamic Banking Diploma program (IBD), etc. and host of other training programs in the area of banking and insurance.

History

Introduction

EIF was founded in 1983 to cater to the human resources development needs of the UAE Banking sector.

In 1990, the Banking Diploma Program was introduced and delivered exclusively by EIBFS.  Since its inception in 1990, 442 students have graduated from the program. Most are working in the banking sector and several are holding senior positions.

In 1996, the EIF took a step forward by signing an agreement with The Institute of Canadian Bankers, Montreal, Canada. This agreement formed the basis of cooperation for offering The Higher Banking Diploma Program. Since its inception in 1997, 60 students have graduated from the program to which most are working in the banking sector and many are holding senior positions.

Banking and Finance UAE

EIF officially launched "Banking and Finance UAE" Magazine in December 2003. "Banking and Finance UAE" is a once a year publication that covers a wide range of topics likes finance, banking, IT applications; Global banking; human resources management, risk management, Basel Accord, and Islamic banking & finance. The magazine aims to provide executives with the information required to keep them up to date with the rapid changes taking place within their industry. The magazine is the first of its kind in the United Arab Emirates; it covers one of the most important sectors in the UAE’s promising economy - the banking and financial sector. Since its first issue, the Magazine has steadily grown in recognition and credibility to become one of the UAE’s most reputed publications. The magazine was issued following a thorough study, which showed the market needed a magazine specialized in both banking and financial sectors. Banking and Finance was issued to serve these two broad sectors, which have a broad base of readers' community.

Study Programs

Academic programs

 Bachelor of Science in Banking and Finance (BSBF)
 Banking Diploma (BD)
 Higher Banking Diploma (HBD)
 Islamic Banking Diploma (IBD)

Training Programs

 Banking and Finance Program Categories
 Anti Money Laundering Programs
 Bank Science & Operations Programs
 Banking English Programs
 Capital & Share Market
 Credit Management, Corporate & Project Finance
 E- Banking Applications Programs
 Human Resources Management & Leadership Programs
 Insurance English Programs
 Insurance Management Programs
 Insurance Operations Programs
 Islamic Banking Programs
 Marketing, Sales & Customer Service Programs
 Private Certificates
 Risk Management & Compliance Programs
 Treasury & Investment Programs
 Insurance Training Categories
 Insurance Programs
 English Programs
 Management Programs

Professional Certificate  Programs

 International Certification Program in Banking Operations (CBO)
 International Certification Program in Credit Management (CCM)
 Certified Documentary Credit Specialist (CDCS)
 Certified Branch Manager (CBM)
 Chartered Financial Analyst (CFA®)
 Chartered Institute for Securities & Investment Qualifications (CISI)
 ICA International Certificate in Compliance Awareness
 ICA International Certificate in Anti Money Laundering Awareness
 International Certification Program in Finance Accounting and Business (CFAB)
 International Certification Program – Certified International Retail Banker
 International Certification Program – Professional in Human Resources (CPHR)

References

Universities and colleges in Sharjah (city)
Buildings and structures in Abu Dhabi
Universities and colleges in Dubai
Education in Abu Dhabi
1983 establishments in the United Arab Emirates